The Chester school protests were a series of demonstrations that occurred from November 1963 through April 1964 in Chester, Pennsylvania. The demonstrations focused on ending the de facto segregation that resulted in the racial categorization of Chester public schools, even after the landmark Supreme Court case Brown v. The Board of Education of Topeka (1954).  The racial unrest and civil rights protests were led by Stanley Branche of the Committee for Freedom Now (CFFN) and George Raymond of the National Association for the Advancement of Colored Persons (NAACP).

In April 1964, a series of almost nightly protests brought chaos to Chester.  The city deputized firemen and trash collectors to help handle demonstrators and the State of Pennsylvania deployed 50 state troopers to assist the 77-member Chester police force. The demonstrations were marked by violence and police brutality which led to Chester being dubbed the "Birmingham of the North" by James Farmer.  Over 600 people were arrested over a two-month period of civil rights rallies, marches, pickets, boycotts and sit-ins. National civil rights leaders such as Dick Gregory, Gloria Richardson and Malcolm X came to Chester in support of the demonstrations.  Pennsylvania Governor William Scranton convinced protestors to obey a court-ordered moratorium on demonstrations by forming the Pennsylvania Human Relations Committee to hold hearings on school desegregation.

The protests resulted in the Pennsylvania Human Relations Committee determination that the Chester School Board had violated the law and the Chester School District was ordered to desegregate the city's six predominantly African-American schools. The city appealed the ruling, which delayed implementation, however the schools were eventually desegregated.

Contributing Factors

Economic Disparity
During the 1950s and 60s, most of Chester's labor force participated in low-paying service positions or industrial work while manufacturing jobs were declining.  White and educated residents of Chester fled to suburban Delaware County to pursue better employment prospects and housing as more black residents moved into Chester.  From 1950 and 1960 the white population decreased by 19% and the black population increased by 53%.  With the white exodus, residential segregation fortified. 80% of the black population resided in a cluster of census tracts in central Chester.  White families that remained in Chester retained a higher income than black families in the city, with the median income for white families $5,880 and the median income for black families $4,059.  Black families constituted 50% of the impoverished population in Chester while white families only constituted 25%.

Poor School Conditions
Majority-black schools suffered from extremely poor funding and overcrowding. Usually old and made of weakening wood and plaster, the schools had neither adequate heating nor sufficient bathrooms for the attending students.  Classrooms were small and stocked with secondhand books.  Franklin Elementary School was a prime example of decrepit school conditions; the facility was constructed in 1910 for five hundred students, but over fifty years later in 1963 it instead served over one thousand students, almost all of them black.  The library at Franklin Elementary was merely a few piles of books, the gym an empty coal bin, and the playground a cement area with a dangerous four-foot drop on one side. The school's average class-size was 39, twice the number of nearby all-white schools. Only two bathrooms were available for the entire school.

Earlier Desegregation Efforts
George Raymond became the leader of the Chester branch of the NAACP in 1942 and began to implement programs to end racial discrimination. He partnered with J. Pius Barbour, the pastor of Calvary Baptist Church in Chester and together they adopted a gradualist approach to civil rights.

In 1945, Raymond and the NAACP successfully desegregated movie theaters, restaurants, hotels and other businesses in Chester through non-violent protests and the threat of legal action.  Previous school integration efforts on behalf of civil rights organizations in Chester had minimal impact before the protests of the 1960s. Following a student strike organized by the NAACP and a committee of black parents in 1946, the school board consented to integrating Chester's public schools.  White parents did their best to inhibit the integration process, and even moved their children to predominantly white schools.  After the 1954 Brown decision, the school board created "neighborhood schools" that supposedly refrained from racial discrimination in student acceptance policies.  These schools satisfied white families as the effects of residential segregation displayed in school demographics.  Only one of Chester's sixteen public schools was substantially racially integrated.  When confronted by local church and civil rights leaders about the de facto segregation caused by "neighborhood schools", the school board acknowledged the lack of integration but blamed it on residential issues over which they had no control.

Stanley Branche arrived back home in Chester in 1962 after participating in activism in the Cambridge movement in Dorchester County, Maryland. Branche recognized the dire circumstances of the Chester school system, especially Franklin Elementary School, and created the Committee for Freedom Now (CFFN) in Chester along with the Swarthmore College chapter of Students for a Democratic Society and disgruntled parents.  Branche became frustrated with the gradualist approach taken by Raymond and the NAACP and proposed more militant protest techniques.

Protest Timeline

Fall 1963
Substantial activism concerning school conditions took approximately a year to incubate in Chester since the establishment of the CFFN, with 20 protesters forming a picket line outside of Franklin Elementary on November 4, 1963 and 130 more joining them by the following Wednesday. After a mass meeting of community members on November 11, the following week 400 people blocked the doors to Franklin Elementary School, which forced the cancellation of school for the day by early morning.  After closing the school, protesters marched to both the Mayor's chambers and the Board of Education.

Protests outside of Franklin Elementary continued on November 13 and 14, with some participants choosing to lie down in front of the doors.  On the morning of November 14, 83 protesters were arrested. Later that day, 50 state troopers arrived to assist the 77-member Chester police force.  Following public attention to the protests stoked by media coverage of the mass arrests, the mayor and school board negotiated with the CFFN and NAACP.  The Chester Board of Education agreed to reduce class sizes at Franklin school, remove unsanitary toilet facilities, relocate classes held in the boiler room and coal bin and repair school grounds.  Even after the school board agreed on the evening of the 14th to repair schools and reduce overcrowding by transferring 173 students from Franklin Elementary school, hundreds of demonstrators crowded the doors of the school on November 15.

Spring 1964
Protests relented for a couple of months while the CFFN established a better structure and added more goals to the organization's agenda, including improving more Chester public schools, increasing the availability of jobs, improving housing and medical care, and generally ending discrimination.

Protests resumed on February 10, 1964, after the CFFN planned a boycott of Chester's public schools to begin the next day.  The boycott resulted in some majority black-attended schools experiencing absence rates of 55%.

The "Freedom Now Conference" was held in Chester on March 14, 1964.  More than 60 delegates and visitors from eight states attended the conference, including Dick Gregory, Gloria Richardson and Malcolm X in support of the protests.  200 protesters from the CFFN marched to present demands to the mayor during the conference.

On March 27, 1964, 300 protestors marched from the West End of Chester to the downtown business district escorted by the entire Chester police force.  On March 28, 200 protestors staged multiple midday sit-down demonstrations at key intersections intended to disrupt downtown traffic.  The protest was met by a violent police response with officers "swinging riot sticks" and arresting all protestors.

The violent response by Chester police resulted in even larger demonstrations with ordinary citizens outraged by the images of peaceful protestors being dragged and beaten by police.  Branche called for massive civil disobedience in response to the police violence and the nightly standoffs between protestors and police overshadowed the original intent of the protests.

The height of the Chester School Protests occurred in April 1964. On April 2, Branche led 350 protestors in front of the police headquarters.  On April 3, the mayor of Chester, James Gorbey, issued "The Police Position to Preserve the Public Peace", a 10-point statement promising an immediate return to law and order. The city deputized firemen and trash collectors to help handle demonstrators. The State of Pennsylvania deployed 50 state troopers to assist the 77-member Chester police force.

On April 20, The CFFN, the NAACP, and the Chester School Board met to discuss the legal charges brought against protesters who were arrested. Raymond presented the school board with a list of 10 demands including teacher transfers, transportation of students to schools in other neighborhoods, hiring blacks for supervisory positions and hiring more black secretaries.  The next day, April 21, the Pennsylvania Human Relations Commission admitted that it failed to bring the civil rights groups and the school board to a compromise.  The school board closed all Chester public schools indefinitely on April 22, claiming the purpose of the closures was to prevent violence.  That night, some of the 300 protesters rallying at the police station were violently beaten by 40 Chester police officers after refusing to disperse.  On April 23, another protest at the police station devolved into a rock throwing melee and six police officers and eight protestors were hospitalized.  Demonstrators held a rally against police brutality and linked arms to block a downtown intersection on April 24, which also ended in police violence.  On April 25, James Farmer dubbed Chester the "Birmingham of the North," in reference to the harsh treatment of protesters in Birmingham, Alabama around the same time.

Some of the white residents of Chester created the Chester Parents Association as a counter response that aimed to keep the neighborhood schools policy.  The group held a rally of 2,000 people on April 26, 1964.

On April 26, Governor William Scranton convinced Branche to obey a court-ordered moratorium on demonstrations. Scranton created the Pennsylvania Human Relations Commission to conduct hearings on the de facto segregation of public schools. All protests were discontinued while the commission held hearings during the summer of 1964.

Judge John V. Diggins granted the requests of the Chester School Board on April 28 to place an injunction that would prohibit demonstrators from protesting on or near public school property, allowing the schools to reopen.  Over 600 people were arrested over a two-month period of civil rights rallies, marches, pickets, boycotts and sit-ins.

Aftermath
On May 4, 1964, the Pennsylvania Human Relations Commission began hearings to determine the state of de facto segregation in Chester.  The hearings included testimonies from multiple civil rights leaders in the area, including a testimony from Branche, a testimony from the school board president, Frances Donahoo, and reports from Commission investigators.  The Commission finally released its verdict in November 1964, saying Chester public schools "had committed and continues to commit unlawful discrimination practices in violation of the Pennsylvania Human Relations Act" and requiring the city to develop a desegregation plan for six predominantly African-American schools by January 31, 1965.  The city appealed the ruling, which delayed implementation.

In June 1964, Chester city leaders formed the Greater Chester Movement (GCM), an umbrella organization intended to coordinate activities of groups working toward the improvement of Chester. When President Lyndon B. Johnson initiated his War on Poverty, the GCM became a conduit through which federal dollars were distributed in Chester with Branche serving on the steering committee.

The Pennsylvania Commonwealth Court ruled on February 15, 1966 that the Pennsylvania Human Relations Commission did not have the authority to force Chester schools to integrate.  In response, the CFFN, NAACP, and Congress of Racial Equality (CORE) announced new demonstrations.  Branche attempted to reinstate another school boycott beginning on April 1, 1966, but most students ignored the boycott.

Over a year later, on September 26, 1967, the Pennsylvania Supreme Court ruled to reinstate the authority of the Pennsylvania Human Relations Commission.  Following this decision, the Chester School Board voted to "eliminate or substantially reduce" the de facto segregation at six schools on October 2, 1967. Charges against protesters who were arrested in the boycotts and demonstrations were not thrown out until 1971.

See also
 Timeline of the civil rights movement
 List of incidents of civil unrest in the United States

References
Citations

Sources

External links
George Raymond Papers at the Widener University Wolfgram Memorial Library Digital Collections
Library of Congress - photos of police brutality at Chester School Protests

1963 in Pennsylvania
1963 protests
1964 in Pennsylvania
1964 protests
African-American history of Pennsylvania
Boycotts
Civil disobedience
Civil rights movement
Civil rights protests in the United States
History of African-American civil rights
History of Chester, Pennsylvania
History of racism in Pennsylvania
Police brutality in the United States
Protest marches
Riots and civil disorder in Pennsylvania
School segregation in the United States